Shiokaze Park is a public park and was a temporary beach volleyball sport venue for the 2020 Summer Olympics, located in Tokyo, Japan.

History

Shiokaze Park opened on June 1st, 1974. It is located in Odaiba Island in Tokyo and has a view of the Rainbow Bridge.

2020 Summer Olympics

Shiokaze Park was the site of a temporary beach volleyball venue for the 2020 Summer Olympics. Its capacity was 12,000.

Vegetation

Shiokaze Park has 12,800 trees and 27,600 shrubs, including the following vegetation:

Cockspur coral tree
Olive tree
Japanese black pine
Crape myrtle
Quercus myrsinifolia
Machilus thunbergii 
Gray Bottlebrush
Matebashii tree 
Wax myrtle
Washington palm tree

References

Venues of the 2020 Summer Olympics
Volleyball venues in Japan
Sports venues in Tokyo
Olympic volleyball venues
Parks in Japan